Maya Tawan ( is a 2013 Thai lakorn, starring Atichart Chumnanon and Urassaya Sperbund. It is airing on Channel 3.

Cast
Atichart Chumnanon (Aum) as Kaede Tawan - A famous movie star
Urassaya Sperbund (Yaya) as Mattana "Mat" - A die hard fan of Kaede, because of the scandal that Kaede had been through and she decided to be a reporter and when she graduated she worked at Siam Saan together with Waree and Mee who became her first friends there.
Rasri Balenciaga (Margie) as Waree - A reporter at Siam Saan and the current partner and friend of Mee, but later also Mat. Among the three of them she is the most troublesome one and described as strong, pretty, and sassy.
Peeranee Kongthai (Matt) as Mee - A reporter at Siam Saan just like Mat and Waree, she is shown to be the complete opposite of Waree since she is well mannered, quiet, and very polite.
Pakorn Chatborirak (Boy) as Police Inspector Hirun  
Sornram Teppitak (Num) as Chatt
Apissada Kreurkongka (Ice)

References

Thai television soap operas
2013 Thai television series debuts
2013 Thai television series endings
2010s Thai television series
Channel 3 (Thailand) original programming